Sulev Teinemaa (10 September 1947 Harju-Risti – 9 May 2020) was an Estonian film journalist.

In 1971 he graduated from Tallinn Polytechnical Institute in electronics, and 1991 Tartu University in journalism. 1971-1988 he worked at the factory Hans Pöögelman Electronics Factory. Since 1988 he was a film editor for the magazine Teater. Muusika. Kino. He wrote film articles for different publications, including for Estonian Encyclopedia.

Awards:
 1998: Film Journalist of the Year

References

1947 births
2020 deaths
Estonian journalists
Tallinn University of Technology alumni
University of Tartu alumni
People from Lääne-Harju Parish